Joel Tiago Gonçalves Rocha (born 18 October 1981) is a Portuguese professional futsal coach who last managed Benfica.

Honours
Fundão
 Taça de Portugal: 2013–14
 Taça Nacional (women): 2008–09
Benfica
 Liga Portuguesa: 2014–15, 2018–19
 Taça de Portugal: 2014–15, 2016–17
 Taça da Liga: 2017–18, 2018–19, 2019–20
 Supertaça de Portugal: 2015, 2016
 UEFA Futsal Cup - Third place: 2015–16

References

1981 births
Living people
People from Covilhã
Portuguese sports coaches
S.L. Benfica futsal managers
Futsal coaches
Sportspeople from Castelo Branco District